The United Kingdom of Great Britain and Northern Ireland, commonly known as the United Kingdom, the UK or Britain, is a  country in Europe, off the north-western coast of the continental mainland. It comprises England, Scotland, Wales and Northern Ireland. The United Kingdom includes the island of Great Britain, the north-eastern part of the island of Ireland, and many smaller islands within the British Isles. Northern Ireland shares a land border with the Republic of Ireland; otherwise, the United Kingdom is surrounded by the Atlantic Ocean, the North Sea, the English Channel, the Celtic Sea and the Irish Sea.

The United Kingdom has evolved from a series of annexations, unions and separations of constituent countries over several hundred years. The Treaty of Union between the Kingdom of England (which also included Wales) and the Kingdom of Scotland in 1707 resulted in their unification to become the Kingdom of Great Britain. Its union in 1801 with the Kingdom of Ireland created the United Kingdom of Great Britain and Ireland. Most of Ireland seceded from the UK in 1922, leaving the present United Kingdom of Great Britain and Northern Ireland, which formally adopted its name in 1927. The nearby Isle of Man, Guernsey and Jersey are not part of the UK, being Crown Dependencies, but the British government is responsible for their defence and international representation. There are also 14 British Overseas Territories, the last remnants of the British Empire which, at its height in the 1920s, encompassed almost a quarter of the world's landmass and population, and was the largest empire in history. A part of the core Anglophonic world, British influence can be observed in the language, culture, legal and political systems of many of its former colonies.

The United Kingdom is a constitutional monarchy and parliamentary democracy. Its capital and largest city is London, the capital of England, a global city and financial centre with a population of over 14 million people. Edinburgh, Cardiff and Belfast are the national capitals of Scotland, Wales and Northern Ireland respectively. Other major cities include Birmingham, Manchester, Leeds, Glasgow and Liverpool. Scotland, Wales, and Northern Ireland have their own devolved governments, each with varying powers. The UK became the world's first industrialised country and was the world's foremost power during the 19th and early 20th centuries, during a period of unchallenged global hegemony known as "Pax Britannica". In the 21st century, the UK remains a great power and has significant economic, cultural, military, scientific, technological and political influence. The UK has the world's sixth-largest economy by nominal gross domestic product (GDP), and the eighth-largest by purchasing power parity. It has a high-income economy and a very high Human Development Index rating, ranking 18th in the world. It also performs well in international rankings of education, healthcare and life expectancy. It is a recognised nuclear state and is ranked fourth globally in military expenditure. It has been a permanent member of the United Nations Security Council since its first session in 1946.

The United Kingdom is a member of the Commonwealth of Nations, the Council of Europe, the G7, the Group of Ten, the G20, Five Eyes, the United Nations (UN), NATO, AUKUS, the Organisation for Economic Co-operation and Development (OECD), Interpol, and the World Trade Organization (WTO). The UK is also considered a part of the "Big Four", or G4, an unofficial group of four European nations. It was a member state of the European Communities (EC) and its successor, the European Union (EU), from its accession in 1973 until its withdrawal in 2020.

Etymology and terminology

In , Britannia referred to the Roman province that encompassed modern day England and Wales. Great Britain encompassed the whole island, taking in the land north of the River Forth known to the Romans as Caledonia in modern Scotland (i.e. "greater" Britain). In the Middle Ages, the name "Britain" was also applied to a small part of France now known as Brittany. As a result, Great Britain (likely from the French "") came into use to refer specifically to the island, with Brittany often referred to as "Little Britain". However, that name had no official significance until 1707, when the island's kingdoms of England and Scotland were united as the Kingdom of Great Britain.

The Acts of Union 1707 declared that the Kingdom of England and Kingdom of Scotland were "United into One Kingdom by the Name of Great Britain". The term "United Kingdom" has occasionally been used as a description for the former Kingdom of Great Britain, although its official name from 1707 to 1800 was simply "Great Britain". The Acts of Union 1800 united the kingdoms of Great Britain and Ireland in 1801, forming the United Kingdom of Great Britain and Ireland. Following the partition of Ireland and the independence of the Irish Free State in 1922, which left Northern Ireland as the only part of the island of Ireland within the United Kingdom, the name was changed to the "United Kingdom of Great Britain and Northern Ireland".

Although the United Kingdom is a sovereign country, England, Scotland, Wales and Northern Ireland are also widely referred to as countries. The UK Prime Minister's website has used the phrase "countries within a country" to describe the United Kingdom. Some statistical summaries, such as those for the twelve NUTS 1 regions of the United Kingdom refer to Scotland, Wales and Northern Ireland as "regions". Northern Ireland is also referred to as a "province". With regard to Northern Ireland, the descriptive name used "can be controversial, with the choice often revealing one's political preferences".

The term "Great Britain" conventionally refers to the island of Great Britain, or politically to England, Scotland and Wales in combination. It is sometimes used as a loose synonym for the United Kingdom as a whole. The word England is occasionally used incorrectly to refer to the United Kingdom as a whole, a mistake principally made by people from outside the UK.

The term "Britain" is used both as a synonym for Great Britain, and as a synonym for the United Kingdom. Usage is mixed: the UK Government prefers to use the term "UK" rather than "Britain" or "British" on its own website (except when referring to embassies), while acknowledging that both terms refer to the United Kingdom and that elsewhere "British government" is used at least as frequently as "United Kingdom government". The UK Permanent Committee on Geographical Names recognises "United Kingdom", "UK" and "U.K." as shortened and abbreviated geopolitical terms for the United Kingdom of Great Britain and Northern Ireland in its toponymic guidelines; it does not list "Britain" but notes that "it is only the one specific nominal term 'Great Britain' which invariably excludes Northern Ireland". The BBC historically preferred to use "Britain" as shorthand only for Great Britain, though the present style guide does not take a position except that "Great Britain" excludes Northern Ireland.

The adjective "British" is commonly used to refer to matters relating to the United Kingdom and is used in law to refer to United Kingdom citizenship and matters to do with nationality. People of the United Kingdom use several different terms to describe their national identity and may identify themselves as being British, English, Scottish, Welsh, Northern Irish, or Irish; or as having a combination of different national identities. The official designation for a citizen of the United Kingdom is "British citizen".

History

Prior to the Treaty of Union 

Settlement by anatomically modern humans of what was to become the United Kingdom occurred in waves beginning by about 30,000 years ago. By the end of the region's prehistoric period, the population is thought to have belonged, in the main, to a culture termed Insular Celtic, comprising Brittonic Britain and Gaelic Ireland.

The Roman conquest, beginning in 43 AD, and the 400-year rule of southern Britain, was followed by an invasion by Germanic Anglo-Saxon settlers, reducing the Brittonic area mainly to what was to become Wales, Cornwall and, until the latter stages of the Anglo-Saxon settlement, the Hen Ogledd (northern England and parts of southern Scotland). Most of the region settled by the Anglo-Saxons became unified as the Kingdom of England in the 10th century. Meanwhile, Gaelic-speakers in north-west Britain (with connections to the north-east of Ireland and traditionally supposed to have migrated from there in the 5th century) united with the Picts to create the Kingdom of Scotland in the 9th century.

	

In 1066, the Normans invaded England from northern France. After conquering England, they seized large parts of Wales, conquered much of Ireland and were invited to settle in Scotland, bringing to each country feudalism on the Northern French model and Norman-French culture. The Anglo-Norman ruling class greatly influenced, but eventually assimilated with, each of the local cultures. Subsequent medieval English kings completed the conquest of Wales and made unsuccessful attempts to annex Scotland. Asserting its independence in the 1320 Declaration of Arbroath, Scotland maintained its independence thereafter, albeit in near-constant conflict with England.

The English monarchs, through inheritance of substantial territories in France and claims to the French crown, were also heavily involved in conflicts in France, most notably the Hundred Years' War, while the Kings of Scots were in an alliance with the French during this period.
Early modern Britain saw religious conflict resulting from the Reformation and the introduction of Protestant state churches in each country. Wales was fully incorporated into the Kingdom of England, and Ireland was constituted as a kingdom in personal union with the English crown. In what was to become Northern Ireland, the lands of the independent Catholic Gaelic nobility were confiscated and given to Protestant settlers from England and Scotland.

The English Reformation ushered in political, constitutional, social and cultural change in the 16th century. Moreover, it defined a national identity for England and slowly, but profoundly, changed people's religious beliefs and established the Church of England.

In 1603, the kingdoms of England, Scotland and Ireland were united in a personal union when James VI, King of Scots, inherited the crowns of England and Ireland and moved his court from Edinburgh to London; each country nevertheless remained a separate political entity and retained its separate political, legal, and religious institutions.

In the mid-17th century, all three kingdoms were involved in a series of connected wars (including the English Civil War) which led to the temporary overthrow of the monarchy, with the execution of King Charles I, and the establishment of the short-lived unitary republic of the Commonwealth of England, Scotland and Ireland.

Although the monarchy was restored, the Interregnum along with the Glorious Revolution of 1688 and the subsequent Bill of Rights 1689 in England and Claim of Right Act 1689 in Scotland ensured that, unlike much of the rest of Europe, royal absolutism would not prevail, and a professed Catholic could never accede to the throne. The British constitution would develop on the basis of constitutional monarchy and the parliamentary system. With the founding of the Royal Society in 1660, science was greatly encouraged. During this period, particularly in England, the development of naval power and the interest in voyages of discovery led to the acquisition and settlement of overseas colonies, particularly in North America and the Caribbean.

Though previous attempts at uniting the two kingdoms within Great Britain in 1606, 1667, and 1689 had proved unsuccessful, the attempt initiated in 1705 led to the Treaty of Union of 1706 being agreed and ratified by both parliaments.

Kingdom of Great Britain

On 1 May 1707, the Kingdom of Great Britain was formed, the result of Acts of Union 1707 being passed by the parliaments of England and Scotland to ratify the 1706 Treaty of Union and so unite the two kingdoms.

In the 18th century, cabinet government developed under Robert Walpole, in practice the first prime minister (1721–1742). A series of Jacobite Uprisings sought to remove the Protestant House of Hanover from the British throne and restore the Catholic House of Stuart. The Jacobites were finally defeated at the Battle of Culloden in 1746, after which the Scottish Highlanders were brutally suppressed. The British colonies in North America that broke away from Britain in the American War of Independence became the United States of America, recognised by Britain in 1783. British imperial ambition turned towards Asia, particularly to India.

Britain played a leading part in the Atlantic slave trade, mainly between 1662 and 1807 when British or British-colonial slave ships transported nearly 3.3 million slaves from Africa. The slaves were taken to work on plantations in British possessions, principally in the Caribbean but also North America. Slavery coupled with the Caribbean sugar industry had a significant role in strengthening and developing the British economy in the 18th century. However, with pressure from the abolitionism movement, Parliament banned the trade in 1807, banned slavery in the British Empire in 1833, and Britain took a role in the movement to abolish slavery worldwide through the blockade of Africa and pressing other nations to end their trade with a series of treaties.

United Kingdom of Great Britain and Ireland

The term "United Kingdom" became official in 1801 when the parliaments of Great Britain and Ireland each passed an Act of Union, uniting the two kingdoms and creating the United Kingdom of Great Britain and Ireland.

After the defeat of France at the end of the French Revolutionary Wars and Napoleonic Wars (1792–1815), the United Kingdom emerged as the principal naval and imperial power of the 19th century (with London the largest city in the world from about 1830). Unchallenged at sea, British dominance was later described as Pax Britannica ("British Peace"), a period of relative peace among the Great Powers (1815–1914) during which the British Empire became the global hegemon and adopted the role of global policeman. By the time of the Great Exhibition of 1851, Britain was described as the "workshop of the world". From 1853 to 1856, Britain took part in the Crimean War, allied with the Ottoman Empire in the fight against the Russian Empire, participating in the naval battles of the Baltic Sea known as the Åland War in the Gulf of Bothnia and the Gulf of Finland, among others. The British Empire was expanded to include India, large parts of Africa and many other territories throughout the world. Alongside the formal control it exerted over its own colonies, British dominance of much of world trade meant that it effectively controlled the economies of many regions, such as Asia and Latin America.

Political attitudes favoured free trade and laissez-faire policies and a gradual widening of the voting franchise. During the century, the population increased at a dramatic rate, accompanied by rapid urbanisation, causing significant social and economic stresses. To seek new markets and sources of raw materials, the Conservative Party under Disraeli launched a period of imperialist expansion in Egypt, South Africa, and elsewhere. Canada, Australia and New Zealand became self-governing dominions. After the turn of the century, Britain's industrial dominance was challenged by Germany and the United States. Social reform and home rule for Ireland were important domestic issues after 1900. The Labour Party emerged from an alliance of trade unions and small socialist groups in 1900, and suffragettes campaigned from before 1914 for women's right to vote.

World wars and partition of Ireland

Britain was one of the principal Allies that fought against the Central Powers in the First World War (1914–1918). Alongside their French, Russian and (after 1917) American counterparts, British armed forces were engaged across much of the British Empire and in several regions of Europe, particularly on the Western Front. The high fatalities of trench warfare caused the loss of much of a generation of men, with lasting social effects in the nation and a great disruption in the social order. After the war, Britain became a permanent member of the Executive Council of the League of Nations and received a mandate over a number of former German and Ottoman colonies. The British Empire reached its greatest extent, covering a fifth of the world's land surface and a quarter of its population. Britain had suffered 2.5 million casualties and finished the war with a huge national debt. The consequences of the war persuaded the government to expand the right to vote in national and local elections with the Representation of the People Act 1918.

By the mid-1920s, most of the British population could listen to BBC radio programmes. Experimental television broadcasts began in 1929 and the first scheduled BBC Television Service commenced in 1936. The rise of Irish nationalism, and disputes within Ireland over the terms of Irish Home Rule, led eventually to the partition of the island in 1921. The Irish Free State became independent, initially with Dominion status in 1922, and unambiguously independent in 1931. Northern Ireland remained part of the United Kingdom. The 1928 Equal Franchise Act gave women electoral equality with men in national elections. A wave of strikes in the mid-1920s culminated in the General Strike of 1926. Britain had still not recovered from the effects of the First World War when the Great Depression (1929–1932) occurred. This led to considerable unemployment and hardship in the old industrial areas, as well as political and social unrest in the 1930s, with rising membership in communist and socialist parties. A coalition government was formed in 1931.

Nonetheless, "Britain was a very wealthy country, formidable in arms, ruthless in pursuit of its interests and sitting at the heart of a global production system." After Nazi Germany invaded Poland, Britain entered the Second World War by declaring war on Germany in 1939. Winston Churchill became prime minister and head of a coalition government in 1940. Despite the defeat of its European allies in the first year of the war, Britain and its Empire continued the war against Germany. Churchill engaged industry, scientists and engineers to advise and support the government and the military in the prosecution of the war effort.

In 1940, the Royal Air Force defeated the German Luftwaffe in a struggle for control of the skies in the Battle of Britain. Urban areas suffered heavy bombing during the Blitz. The Grand Alliance of Britain, the United States and the Soviet Union formed in 1941, leading the Allies against the Axis powers. There were eventual hard-fought victories in the Battle of the Atlantic, the North Africa campaign and the Italian campaign. British forces played an important role in the Normandy landings of 1944 and the liberation of Europe, achieved with its allies the United States, the Soviet Union and other Allied countries. The British Army led the Burma campaign against Japan, and the British Pacific Fleet fought Japan at sea. British scientists contributed to the Manhattan Project to design a nuclear weapon, which led to the surrender of Japan.

Postwar 20th century

During the Second World War, the UK was one of the Big Three powers (along with the U.S. and the Soviet Union) who met to plan the post-war world; it was an original signatory to the Declaration by United Nations. After the war, the UK became one of the five permanent members of the United Nations Security Council and worked closely with the United States to establish the IMF, World Bank and NATO. The war left the UK severely weakened and financially dependent on the Marshall Plan, but it was spared the total war that devastated eastern Europe.

In the immediate post-war years, the Labour government initiated a radical programme of reforms, which had a significant effect on British society in the following decades. Major industries and public utilities were nationalised, a welfare state was established, and a comprehensive, publicly funded healthcare system, the National Health Service, was created. The rise of nationalism in the colonies coincided with Britain's now much-diminished economic position, so that a policy of decolonisation was unavoidable. Independence was granted to India and Pakistan in 1947. Over the next three decades, most colonies of the British Empire gained their independence, with all those that sought independence supported by the UK, during both the transition period and afterwards. Many became members of the Commonwealth of Nations.

The UK was the third country to develop a nuclear weapons arsenal (with its first atomic bomb test, Operation Hurricane, in 1952), but the new post-war limits of Britain's international role were illustrated by the Suez Crisis of 1956. The international spread of the English language ensured the continuing international influence of its literature and culture. As a result of a shortage of workers in the 1950s, the government encouraged immigration from Commonwealth countries. In the following decades, the UK became a more multi-ethnic society than before. Despite rising living standards in the late 1950s and 1960s, the UK's economic performance was less successful than many of its main competitors such as France, West Germany and Japan.

In the decades-long process of European integration, the UK was a founding member of the alliance called the Western European Union, established with the London and Paris Conferences in 1954. In 1960 the UK was one of the seven founding members of the European Free Trade Association (EFTA), but in 1973 it left to join the European Communities (EC). When the EC became the European Union (EU) in 1992, the UK was one of the 12 founding member states. The Treaty of Lisbon, signed in 2007, forms the constitutional basis of the European Union since then.

From the late 1960s, Northern Ireland suffered communal and paramilitary violence (sometimes affecting other parts of the UK) conventionally known as the Troubles. It is usually considered to have ended with the Belfast "Good Friday" Agreement of 1998.

Following a period of widespread economic slowdown and industrial strife in the 1970s, the Conservative government of the 1980s under Margaret Thatcher initiated a radical policy of monetarism, deregulation, particularly of the financial sector (for example, the Big Bang in 1986) and labour markets, the sale of state-owned companies (privatisation), and the withdrawal of subsidies to others.

In 1982, Argentina invaded the British territories of South Georgia and the Falkland Islands. The occupation provoked a military response from the United Kingdom leading to the Falklands War which lasted for 10 weeks. Argentine forces were defeated and surrendered to British troops. The inhabitants of the islands are predominantly descendants of British settlers, and strongly favour British sovereignty, as shown by a 2013 referendum. From 1984, the UK economy was helped by the inflow of substantial North Sea oil revenues.

Around the end of the 20th century, there were major changes to the governance of the UK with the establishment of devolved administrations for Scotland, Wales and Northern Ireland. The statutory incorporation followed acceptance of the European Convention on Human Rights. The UK remained a Great Power with global diplomatic and military influence and a leading role in the United Nations and NATO.

21st century

The UK broadly supported the United States' approach to the "war on terror" in the early years of the 21st century. Controversy surrounded some of Britain's overseas military deployments, particularly in Afghanistan and Iraq.

The 2008 global financial crisis severely affected the UK economy. The Cameron–Clegg coalition government of 2010 introduced austerity measures intended to tackle the substantial public deficits which resulted. The devolved Scottish Government and UK Government agreed for a referendum to be held on Scottish independence in 2014. This referendum resulted in the electorate in Scotland voting by 55.3 to 44.7% for Scotland to remain part of the United Kingdom.

In 2016, 51.9 per cent of voters in the United Kingdom voted to leave the European Union. The UK left the EU on 31 January 2020 and completed its withdrawal in full at the end of that year.

The COVID-19 pandemic had a severe impact on the UK's economy, caused major disruptions to education and had far-reaching impacts on society and politics in 2020 and 2021. The United Kingdom was the first country in the world to use an approved COVID-19 vaccine, they also developed their own vaccine between Oxford University and AstraZeneca which allowed them to roll-out the vaccine nationwide quickly.

On 8 September 2022, Elizabeth II, the longest-living and longest-reigning British monarch, died at the age of 96. Upon the Queen's death, her eldest child Charles, Prince of Wales, acceded to the British throne as King Charles III.

Geography

The country occupies the major part of the British Isles archipelago and includes the island of Great Britain, the north-eastern one-sixth of the island of Ireland and some smaller surrounding islands. It lies between the North Atlantic Ocean and the North Sea with the southeast coast coming within  of the coast of northern France, from which it is separated by the English Channel.

In 1993 10 per cent of the UK was forested, 46 per cent used for pastures and 25 per cent cultivated for agriculture. The Royal Greenwich Observatory in London was chosen as the defining point of the Prime Meridian in Washington, DC, in 1884, although due to more accurate modern measurement the meridian actually lies 100 metres to the east of the observatory.

The United Kingdom lies between latitudes 49° and 61° N, and longitudes 9° W and 2° E. Northern Ireland shares a  land boundary with the Republic of Ireland.

The UK contains four terrestrial ecoregions: Celtic broadleaf forests, English Lowlands beech forests, North Atlantic moist mixed forests, and Caledon conifer forests. The country had a 2019 Forest Landscape Integrity Index mean score of 1.65/10, ranking it 161th globally out of 172 countries.

Climate

Most of the United Kingdom has a temperate climate, with generally cool temperatures and plentiful rainfall all year round. The temperature varies with the seasons seldom dropping below  or rising above . Some parts, away from the coast, of upland England, Wales, Northern Ireland and most of Scotland, experience a subpolar oceanic climate (Cfc). Higher elevations in Scotland experience a continental subarctic climate (Dfc) and the mountains experience a tundra climate (ET).

The prevailing wind is from the southwest and bears frequent spells of mild and wet weather from the Atlantic Ocean, although the eastern parts are mostly sheltered from this wind. Since the majority of the rain falls over the western regions, the eastern parts are therefore the driest. Atlantic currents, warmed by the Gulf Stream, bring mild winters; especially in the west where winters are wet and even more so over high ground. Summers are warmest in the southeast of England and coolest in the north. Heavy snowfall can occur in winter and early spring on high ground, and occasionally settles to great depth away from the hills.

The average total annual sunshine in the United Kingdom is 1339.7 hours, which is just under 30% of the maximum possible. The hours of sunshine vary from 1200 to about 1580 hours per year, and since 1996 the UK has been and still is receiving above the 1981 to 2010 average hours of sunshine.

United Kingdom is ranked 4 out of 180 countries in the Environmental Performance Index. A law has been passed that UK greenhouse gas emissions will be net zero by 2050.

Topography 
England accounts for just over half (53 per cent) of the total area of the UK, covering . Most of the country consists of lowland terrain, with more upland and some mountainous terrain northwest of the Tees–Exe line; including the Lake District, the Pennines, Exmoor and Dartmoor. The main rivers and estuaries are the Thames, Severn and the Humber. England's highest mountain is Scafell Pike in the Lake District.

Scotland accounts for just under one-third (32 per cent) of the total area of the UK, covering . This includes nearly 800 islands, predominantly west and north of the mainland; notably the Hebrides, Orkney Islands and Shetland Islands. Scotland is the most mountainous country in the UK and its topography is distinguished by the Highland Boundary Fault – a geological rock fracture – which traverses Scotland from Arran in the west to Stonehaven in the east. The fault separates two distinctively different regions; namely the Highlands to the north and west and the Lowlands to the south and east. Lowland areas – especially the narrow waist of land between the Firth of Clyde and the Firth of Forth known as the Central Belt – are flatter and home to most of the population including Glasgow, Scotland's largest city, and Edinburgh, its capital and political centre, although upland and mountainous terrain lies within the Southern Uplands.

Wales accounts for less than one-tenth (9 per cent) of the total area of the UK, covering . Wales is mostly mountainous, though South Wales is less mountainous than North and mid Wales. The main population and industrial areas are in South Wales, consisting of the coastal cities of Cardiff, Swansea and Newport, and the South Wales Valleys to their north. Several islands lie off the Welsh mainland, the largest of which is Anglesey (Ynys Môn) in the north-west.

Government and politics

Constitutional principles

The Constitution of the United Kingdom is uncodified and consists mostly of a collection of disparate written sources, including statutes, judge-made case law and international treaties, together with constitutional conventions. Nevertheless, the Supreme Court recognises a number of principles underlying the British constitution, such as parliamentary sovereignty, the rule of law, democracy, and upholding international law.

The Supreme Court also recognises that some acts of Parliament have special constitutional status, and are therefore part of the constitution. These include Magna Carta, which in 1215 required the King to call a "common counsel" (now called Parliament) to represent people, to hold courts in a fixed place, to guarantee fair trials, to guarantee free movement of people, to free the church from the state, and to guarantee rights of "common" people to use the land. (Most of Magna Carta is no longer in force; those principles it established that still exist are mostly protected by other enactments.) After the Wars of the Three Kingdoms and the Glorious Revolution, the Bill of Rights 1689 and the Claim of Right Act 1689 cemented Parliament's position as the supreme law-making body, and said that the "election of members of Parliament ought to be free".

In accordance with the principle of parliamentary sovereignty, the UK Parliament can carry out constitutional reform through acts of Parliament, and thus has the political power to change or abolish almost any written or unwritten element of the constitution. No sitting parliament can pass laws that future parliaments cannot change.

The sovereign
The United Kingdom is a unitary state under a constitutional monarchy. King Charles III is the monarch and head of state of the UK, as well as 14 other independent countries. These 15 countries are sometimes referred to as "Commonwealth realms". The monarch is formally vested with all executive authority as the personal embodiment of the Crown. The disposition of such powers however, including those belonging to the royal prerogative, is generally exercised only on the advice of ministers of the Crown responsible to Parliament and thence to the electorate. Nevertheless, in the performance of executive duties, the monarch has "the right to be consulted, the right to encourage, and the right to warn". In addition, the monarch has a number of reserve powers at his disposal in order to uphold responsible government and prevent constitutional crises. These reserve powers are particularly relevant to the appointment of a prime minister, preventing unconstitutional use of the British Armed Forces, the prorogation and dissolution of Parliament, the enactment of legislation, and conferring state honours.

Parliament

The UK is a parliamentary democracy operating under the Westminster system, otherwise known as a "democratic parliamentary monarchy". The Parliament of the United Kingdom is sovereign. It is made up of the House of Commons, the House of Lords and the Crown. The main business of parliament takes place in the two houses, but royal assent is required for a bill to become an act of parliament (law).

For general elections (elections to the House of Commons), the UK is divided into 650 constituencies, each of which is represented by a member of Parliament (MP). MPs hold office for up to five years and are always up for re-election in general elections. The Conservative Party, Labour Party and Scottish National Party are, respectively, the current first, second and third largest parties (by number of MPs) in the House of Commons.

Prime minister
The prime minister is the head of government in the United Kingdom. Nearly all prime ministers have served concurrently as First Lord of the Treasury and all prime ministers have continuously served as First Lord of the Treasury since 1905, Minister for the Civil Service since 1968 and Minister for the Union since 2019. In modern times, the prime minister is, by constitutional convention, an MP. The prime minister is appointed by the monarch and their appointment is governed by constitutional conventions. However, they are normally the leader of the political party with the most seats in the House of Commons and hold office by virtue of their ability to command the confidence of the House of Commons.

The prime minister not only has statutory functions (alongside other ministers), but is the monarch's principal adviser and it is for them to advise the monarch on the exercise of the royal prerogative in relation to government. In particular, the prime minister recommends the appointment of ministers and chairs the Cabinet.

Administrative divisions

The geographical division of the United Kingdom into counties or shires began in England and Scotland in the early Middle Ages, and was completed throughout Great Britain and Ireland by the early Modern Period. Administrative arrangements were developed separately in each country of the United Kingdom, with origins that often predated the formation of the United Kingdom. Modern local government by elected councils, partly based on the ancient counties, was established by separate Acts of Parliament: in England and Wales in 1888, Scotland in 1889 and Ireland in 1898, meaning there is no consistent system of administrative or geographic demarcation across the UK.
Until the 19th century there was little change to those arrangements, but there has since been a constant evolution of role and function.

The organisation of local government in England is complex, with the distribution of functions varying according to local arrangements. The upper-tier subdivisions of England are the nine regions, now used primarily for statistical purposes. One of the regions, Greater London, has had a directly elected assembly and mayor since 2000 following popular support for the proposal in a 1998 referendum. It was intended that other regions would also be given their own elected regional assemblies, but a proposed assembly in the North East region was rejected by a referendum in 2004. Since 2011, ten combined authorities have been established in England. Eight of these have elected mayors, elections for which first took place in May 2017. Below the regional tier, some parts of England have county councils and district councils, and others have unitary authorities, while London consists of 32 London boroughs and the City of London. Councillors are elected by the first-past-the-post system in single-member wards or by the multi-member plurality system in multi-member wards.

For local government purposes, Scotland is divided into 32 council areas with a wide variation in both size and population. The cities of Glasgow, Edinburgh, Aberdeen and Dundee are separate council areas, as is the Highland Council, which includes a third of Scotland's area but only just over 200,000 people. Local councils are made up of elected councillors, of whom there are 1,223; they are paid a part-time salary. Elections are conducted by single transferable vote in multi-member wards that elect either three or four councillors. Each council elects a Provost, or Convenor, to chair meetings of the council and to act as a figurehead for the area.

Local government in Wales consists of 22 unitary authorities, each led by a leader and cabinet elected by the council itself. These include the cities of Cardiff, Swansea and Newport, which are unitary authorities in their own right. Elections are held every four years under the first-past-the-post system.

Since 1973, local government in Northern Ireland has been organised into 26 district councils, each elected by single transferable vote. Their powers are limited to services such as waste collection, dog control, and maintaining parks and cemeteries. In 2008 the executive agreed on proposals to create 11 new councils and replace the present system.

Devolved governments

Scotland, Wales and Northern Ireland each have their own government or executive, led by a first minister (or, in the case of Northern Ireland, a diarchal first minister and deputy first minister), and a devolved unicameral legislature. England, the largest country of the United Kingdom, has no devolved executive or legislature and is administered and legislated for directly by the UK's government and parliament on all issues. This situation has given rise to the so-called West Lothian question, which concerns the fact that members of parliament from Scotland, Wales and Northern Ireland can vote, sometimes decisively, on matters that affect only England. The 2013 McKay Commission on this recommended that laws affecting only England should need support from a majority of English members of parliament.

The Scottish Government and Parliament have wide-ranging powers over any matter that has not been specifically reserved to the UK Parliament, including education, healthcare, Scots law and local government. Their power over economic issues is significantly constrained by an act of the UK parliament passed in 2020.

The Welsh Government and the Senedd (Welsh Parliament; formerly the National Assembly for Wales) have more limited powers than those devolved to Scotland. The Senedd is able to legislate on any matter not specifically reserved to the UK Parliament through Acts of Senedd Cymru.

The Northern Ireland Executive and Assembly have powers similar to those devolved to Scotland. The Executive is led by a diarchy representing unionist and nationalist members of the Assembly. Devolution to Northern Ireland is contingent on participation by the Northern Ireland administration in the North-South Ministerial Council, where the Northern Ireland Executive cooperates and develops joint and shared policies with the Government of Ireland. The British and Irish governments co-operate on non-devolved matters affecting Northern Ireland through the British–Irish Intergovernmental Conference, which assumes the responsibilities of the Northern Ireland administration in the event of its non-operation.

The UK does not have a codified constitution and constitutional matters are not among the powers devolved to Scotland, Wales or Northern Ireland. Under the doctrine of parliamentary sovereignty, the UK Parliament could, in theory, therefore, abolish the Scottish Parliament, Senedd or Northern Ireland Assembly. Indeed, in 1972, the UK Parliament unilaterally prorogued the Parliament of Northern Ireland, setting a precedent relevant to contemporary devolved institutions. In practice, it would be politically difficult for the UK Parliament to abolish devolution to the Scottish Parliament and the Senedd, given the political entrenchment created by referendum decisions. The political constraints placed upon the UK Parliament's power to interfere with devolution in Northern Ireland are even greater than in relation to Scotland and Wales, given that devolution in Northern Ireland rests upon an international agreement with the Government of Ireland. The UK Parliament restricts the three devolved parliaments' legislative competence in economic areas through an Act passed in 2020.

Dependencies

The United Kingdom, the 14 British Overseas Territories and the three Crown Dependencies form 'one undivided Realm'. All parts of the realm are under the sovereignty of the British Crown, but the Territories and Dependencies are not part of the UK. This is distinct from the status of Commonwealth realms, who have separate monarchies, but share the same monarch.

The 14 British Overseas Territories are remnants of the British Empire: Anguilla; Bermuda; the British Antarctic Territory; the British Indian Ocean Territory; the British Virgin Islands; the Cayman Islands; the Falkland Islands; Gibraltar; Montserrat; Saint Helena, Ascension and Tristan da Cunha; the Turks and Caicos Islands; the Pitcairn Islands; South Georgia and the South Sandwich Islands; and Akrotiri and Dhekelia on the island of Cyprus. British claims in Antarctica have limited international recognition. A 1999 UK government white paper stated that: "[The] Overseas Territories are British for as long as they wish to remain British. Britain has willingly granted independence where it has been requested; and we will continue to do so where this is an option." Self-determination is also enshrined in the constitutions of several overseas territories and three have specifically voted to remain under British sovereignty (Bermuda in 1995, Gibraltar in 2002 and the Falkland Islands in 2013).

The Crown Dependencies are possessions of the Crown, as opposed to territories of the UK. They comprise three independently administered jurisdictions: the Bailiwicks of Jersey and of Guernsey in the English Channel, and the Isle of Man in the Irish Sea. By mutual agreement, the British Government manages the islands' foreign affairs and defence and the UK Parliament has the authority to legislate on their behalf. Internationally, they are regarded as "territories for which the United Kingdom is responsible". The power to pass legislation affecting the islands ultimately rests with their own respective legislative assemblies, with the assent of the Crown (Privy Council or, in the case of the Isle of Man, in certain circumstances the Lieutenant-Governor). Since 2005 each Crown dependency has had a Chief Minister as its head of government.

Law and criminal justice

The United Kingdom does not have a single legal system as Article 19 of the 1706 Treaty of Union provided for the continuation of Scotland's separate legal system. Today the UK has three distinct systems of law: English law, Northern Ireland law and Scots law. A new Supreme Court of the United Kingdom came into being in October 2009 to replace the Appellate Committee of the House of Lords. The Judicial Committee of the Privy Council, including the same members as the Supreme Court, is the highest court of appeal for several independent Commonwealth countries, the British Overseas Territories and the Crown Dependencies.

Both English law, which applies in England and Wales, and Northern Ireland law are based on common-law principles. The essence of common law is that, subject to statute, the law is developed by judges in courts, applying statute, precedent and common sense to the facts before them to give explanatory judgements of the relevant legal principles, which are reported and binding in future similar cases (stare decisis). The courts of England and Wales are headed by the Senior Courts of England and Wales, consisting of the Court of Appeal, the High Court of Justice (for civil cases) and the Crown Court (for criminal cases). The Supreme Court is the highest court in the land for both criminal and civil appeal cases in England, Wales and Northern Ireland and any decision it makes is binding on every other court in the same jurisdiction, often having a persuasive effect in other jurisdictions.
Scots law is a hybrid system based on both common-law and civil-law principles. The chief courts are the Court of Session, for civil cases, and the High Court of Justiciary, for criminal cases. The Supreme Court of the United Kingdom serves as the highest court of appeal for civil cases under Scots law. Sheriff courts deal with most civil and criminal cases including conducting criminal trials with a jury, known as sheriff solemn court, or with a sheriff and no jury, known as sheriff summary Court. The Scots legal system is unique in having three possible verdicts for a criminal trial: "guilty", "not guilty" and "not proven". Both "not guilty" and "not proven" result in an acquittal.

Crime in England and Wales increased in the period between 1981 and 1995, though since that peak there has been an overall fall of 66 per cent in recorded crime from 1995 to 2015, according to crime statistics. The prison population of England and Wales has increased to 86,000, giving England and Wales the highest rate of incarceration in Western Europe at 148 per 100,000. His Majesty's Prison Service, which reports to the Ministry of Justice, manages most of the prisons within England and Wales. The murder rate in England and Wales has stabilised in the first half of the 2010s with a murder rate around 1 per 100,000 which is half the peak in 2002 and similar to the rate in the 1980s Crime in Scotland fell slightly in 2014–2015 to its lowest level in 39 years with 59 killings for a murder rate of 1.1 per 100,000. Scotland's prisons are overcrowded but the prison population is shrinking.

Foreign relations

The UK is a permanent member of the United Nations Security Council, a member of NATO, AUKUS, the Commonwealth of Nations, the G7 finance ministers, the G7 forum, the G20, the OECD, the WTO, the Council of Europe and the OSCE. The UK has the British Council which is a British organisation based in over 100 countries specialising in international cultural and educational opportunities. The UK is said to have a "Special Relationship" with the United States and a close partnership with France – the "Entente cordiale" – and shares nuclear weapons technology with both countries; the Anglo-Portuguese Alliance is considered to be the oldest binding military alliance in the world. The UK is also closely linked with the Republic of Ireland; the two countries share a Common Travel Area and co-operate through the British-Irish Intergovernmental Conference and the British-Irish Council. Britain's global presence and influence is further amplified through its trading relations, foreign investments, official development assistance and military engagements. Canada, Australia and New Zealand, all of which are former colonies of the British Empire which share King Charles as their head of state, are the most favourably viewed countries in the world by British people.

Military

His Majesty's Armed Forces consist of three professional service branches: the Royal Navy and Royal Marines (forming the Naval Service), the British Army and the Royal Air Force. The armed forces of the United Kingdom are managed by the Ministry of Defence and controlled by the Defence Council, chaired by the Secretary of State for Defence. The Commander-in-Chief is the British monarch, to whom members of the forces swear an oath of allegiance. The Armed Forces are charged with protecting the UK and its overseas territories, promoting the UK's global security interests and supporting international peacekeeping efforts. They are active and regular participants in NATO, including the Allied Rapid Reaction Corps, the Five Power Defence Arrangements, RIMPAC and other worldwide coalition operations. Overseas garrisons and facilities are maintained in Ascension Island, Bahrain, Belize, Brunei, Canada, Cyprus, Diego Garcia, the Falkland Islands, Germany, Gibraltar, Kenya, Oman, Qatar and Singapore.

The British armed forces played a key role in establishing the British Empire as the dominant world power in the 18th, 19th and early 20th centuries. By emerging victorious from conflicts, Britain has often been able to decisively influence world events. Since the end of the British Empire, the UK has remained a major military power. Following the end of the Cold War, defence policy has a stated assumption that "the most demanding operations" will be undertaken as part of a coalition.

According to sources which include the Stockholm International Peace Research Institute and the International Institute for Strategic Studies, the UK has either the fourth- or the fifth-highest military expenditure. Total defence spending amounts to 2.0 per cent of national GDP.

Economy

Overview

The United Kingdom uses the pound sterling which is the world's oldest currency that is still in use and that has been in continuous use since its inception. It is currently the fourth most-traded currency in the foreign exchange market and is the world's fourth-largest reserve currency (after the Dollar, Euro, and Yen). London is the world capital for foreign exchange trading, with a global market share of 38.1% in 2022 of the daily $7.5 trillion global turnover. Since 1997 the Bank of England's Monetary Policy Committee, headed by the Governor of the Bank of England, has been responsible for setting interest rates at the level necessary to achieve the overall inflation target for the economy that is set by the Chancellor each year. Lloyd’s of London is the world's largest insurance and reinsurance market and is located in London, UK.

The UK has a partially regulated market economy. Based on market exchange rates, the UK is today the sixth-largest economy in the world and the second-largest in Europe. HM Treasury, led by the Chancellor of the Exchequer, is responsible for developing and executing the government's public finance policy and economic policy. The Bank of England is the UK's central bank and is responsible for issuing notes and coins in the nation's currency, the pound sterling. Banks in Scotland and Northern Ireland retain the right to issue their own notes, subject to retaining enough Bank of England notes in reserve to cover their issue.

The service sector made up around 80% of the UK's GVA in 2021. London is one of the world's largest financial centres, ranking second in the world in the Global Financial Centres Index in 2022. London also has the largest city GDP in Europe. Edinburgh ranks 17th in the world, and sixth in Western Europe in the Global Financial Centres Index in 2020. Tourism is very important to the British economy; London was named as Europe’s most popular destination for 2022. The creative industries accounted for 5.9% of the UK's GVA in 2019, having grown by 43.6% in real terms from 2010. Creative industries contributed more than £111bn to the UK economy in 2018, growth in the sector is more than five times larger than growth across the UK economy as a whole as reported in 2018. WPP plc, the world's biggest advertising company, is also based in the UK.

Following the United Kingdom's withdrawal from the European Union, the functioning of the UK internal economic market is enshrined by the United Kingdom Internal Market Act 2020 which ensures trade in goods and services continues without internal barriers across the four countries of the United Kingdom.

The Industrial Revolution started in Britain with an initial concentration on the textile industry, followed by other heavy industries such as shipbuilding, coal mining and steelmaking. British merchants, shippers and bankers developed overwhelming advantage over those of other nations allowing the UK to dominate international trade in the 19th century. Ship building continues, between September 2021 and the end of 2022, the UK Government announced £4.34 billion in shipbuilding contracts to UK companies. The UK also produces luxury boats from Princess, Sunseeker and Fairline. Manufacturing remains a significant part of the economy but accounted for only 9.2 per cent of national output in 2022.

The automotive industry employs around 800,000 people, with a turnover in 2022 of £67 billion, generating £27 billion of exports (10% of the UK's total export of goods). In 2022, the UK produced around 775,000 passenger vehicles and 101,600 commercial vehicles, including luxury cars such as Rolls-Royce, Bentley and Range Rover. The UK is a major centre for engine manufacturing: in 2021 around 1.6 million engines were produced. The UK motorsport industry employs more than 40,000 people, comprises around 4,300 companies and has an annual turnover of around £10 billion.
7 of the 10 Formula One teams are based in the UK, with their technology being used in supercars and hypercars from McLaren, Aston Martin and Lotus.

The aerospace industry of the UK is the second- or third-largest national aerospace industry in the world depending upon the method of measurement and has an annual turnover of around £30 billion.
BAE Systems plays a critical role in some of the world's biggest defence aerospace projects. In the UK, the company makes large sections of the Typhoon Eurofighter and assembles the aircraft for the Royal Air Force, the plane was based on the British Aerospace EAP design which first flew in 1986. BAE Systems is also a principal subcontractor on the F35 Joint Strike Fighter – the world's largest single defence project – for which it designs and manufactures a range of components. It also manufactures the Hawk, the world's most successful jet training aircraft. Airbus UK also produces defence aircraft, commercial aircraft and is the UK’s biggest space company. All European produced wings on Airbus commercial aircraft are designed and built in the UK with the majority built in North Wales with local revenues of £4.4 billion. Rolls-Royce is an industrial technology company, it is the world's second-largest aero-engine manufacturer, sustainable power manufacturer and defence contractor. Other major security and defence contractors include Babcock International, QinetiQ and Martin-Baker - the world leading manufacturer of ejection seats.

The UK space industry was worth £16.5bn in 2019/20 and employed 47,000 people. Since 2012, the number of space organisations has grown on average nearly 21% per year, with 1,293 organisations reported in 2021. The UK Space Agency has stated in 2023 that it is investing £1.6 billion in space related projects that could revolutionise our ability to journey deeper into space.

The agriculture industry is intensive, highly mechanised and efficient by European standards, producing about 60 per cent of food needs with less than 1.6 per cent of the labour force (535,000 workers). Around two-thirds of production is devoted to livestock, one-third to arable crops. The UK retains a significant, though much reduced fishing industry. It is also rich in a variety of natural resources including coal, petroleum, natural gas, tin, limestone, iron ore, salt, clay, chalk, gypsum, lead, silica and an abundance of arable land.

In 2020, during the COVID-19 pandemic the UK Government introduced Coronavirus Job Retention Scheme which paid up to 80% of an employees income to stay at home, if they were not able to work from home and they were not an essential worker. Measures caused the UK economy to shrink by 20.4 per cent between April and June compared to the first three months of that year.

The UK annual GDP output is estimated to have grown by 4.1% in 2022. The UK Government debt was £2,436.7 billion at the end of Quarter 2 (Apr to June) 2022. The UK has the 2nd best debt-to-GDP ratio out of the G7 countries.

Science and technology

England and Scotland were leading centres of the Scientific Revolution from the 17th century. The United Kingdom led the Industrial Revolution from the 18th century, and has continued to produce scientists and engineers credited with important advances. Major theorists from the 17th and 18th centuries include Isaac Newton, whose laws of motion and illumination of gravity have been seen as a keystone of modern science; from the 19th century Charles Darwin, whose theory of evolution by natural selection was fundamental to the development of modern biology, and James Clerk Maxwell, who formulated classical electromagnetic theory; and more recently Stephen Hawking, who advanced major theories in the fields of cosmology, quantum gravity and the investigation of black holes.

Major scientific discoveries from the 18th century include hydrogen by Henry Cavendish; from the 20th century penicillin by Alexander Fleming, and the structure of DNA, by Francis Crick and others. Famous British engineers and inventors of the Industrial Revolution include James Watt, George Stephenson, Richard Arkwright, Robert Stephenson and Isambard Kingdom Brunel. Other major engineering projects and applications by people from the UK include the steam locomotive, developed by Richard Trevithick and Andrew Vivian; from the 19th century the electric motor by Michael Faraday, the first computer designed by Charles Babbage, the first algorithm by  Ada Lovelace, the first commercial electrical telegraph by William Fothergill Cooke and Charles Wheatstone, the incandescent light bulb by Joseph Swan, and the first practical telephone, patented by Alexander Graham Bell; and in the 20th century the world's first working television system by John Logie Baird and others, the jet engine by Frank Whittle, the theoretical basis of the modern computer by Alan Turing, the Ferranti Mark 1 - the first commercially available general-purpose digital computer, the concept of the integrated circuit by Geoffrey Dummer, the World Wide Web by Tim Berners-Lee, who leads the W3C, and key Apple products by Jony Ive.

Scientific research and development remains important in British universities, with many establishing science parks to facilitate production and co-operation with industry. During 2022 the UK produced 6.3 per cent of the world's scientific research papers and had an 10.5 per cent share of scientific citations, the third highest in the world (for both). The UK ranked 1st in the world for Field-Weighted Citation Impact. Scientific journals produced in the UK include publications by the Royal Society, Nature, the British Medical Journal and The Lancet. London ranks in 1st place overall in The European Digital Social Innovation Index which ranks cities against 32 criteria grouped into 6 themes, it also ranks London in 1st place for the skills theme. In 2023 London ranks in 1st place in the rankings for best cities for startups in Europe. The United Kingdom was ranked fourth in the Global Innovation Index 2020, 2021 and 2022, which is based on around 80 indicators, including measures of the political environment, education, infrastructure and knowledge creation. Within the related report it was found that Cambridge was the most 'Science and Technology' intensive cluster in the world.

UK technology company, Arm produces semiconductor intellectual property which is used in over 250 billion chips globally. About 70% of the world's population use Arm-based technology and are used in products of major global brands.

Transport

The M25, encircling London, is the largest and busiest bypass in the world. In 2022 there were a total of 40.8 million licensed vehicles in Great Britain.

The rail network in the UK is the oldest such network in the world. The system consists of five high-speed main lines (the West Coast, East Coast, Midland, Great Western and Great Eastern), which radiate from London to the rest of the country, augmented by regional rail lines and dense commuter networks within the major cities. High Speed 1 is operationally separate from the rest of the network. The world's first passenger railway running on steam was the Stockton and Darlington Railway, opened in 1825. Just under five years later the world's first intercity railway was the Liverpool and Manchester Railway, designed by George Stephenson. The network grew rapidly as a patchwork of hundreds of separate companies during the Victorian era.

Railways in Northern Ireland are operated by NI Railways, a subsidiary of state-owned Translink. In Great Britain, the British Rail network was privatised between 1994 and 1997, which was followed by a rapid rise in passenger numbers. The UK was ranked eighth among national European rail systems in the 2017 European Railway Performance Index assessing intensity of use, quality of service and safety. HS2 is a new high speed railway under construction linking up London, the Midlands, the North and Scotland serving over 25 stations, including eight of Britain's 10 largest cities and connecting around 30 million people, capable of speeds of up to 225 mph. Crossrail, which was renamed the Elizabeth line in 2016, in honour of Queen Elizabeth II, opened in 2022, it was Europe's largest construction project at the time and will bring in an estimated £42 billion to the UK economy.

Great British Railways is a planned state-owned public body that will oversee rail transport in Great Britain from 2023. In 2014, there were 5.2 billion bus journeys in the UK, 2.4 billion of which were in London. The red double-decker bus has entered popular culture as an internationally recognised icon of England. The London bus network is extensive, with over 6,800 scheduled services every weekday carrying about six million passengers on over 700 different routes making it one of the most extensive bus systems in the world and the largest in Europe.

In the year from October 2009 to September 2010 UK airports handled a total of 211.4 million passengers. In that period the three largest airports were London Heathrow Airport (65.6 million passengers), Gatwick Airport (31.5 million passengers) and London Stansted Airport (18.9 million passengers).

Energy

In 2021, the UK was the world's 14th-largest consumer of energy and the 22nd-largest producer. The UK is home to many large energy companies, including two of the six major oil and gas companies – BP and Shell.

The total of all renewable electricity sources provided 38.9 per cent of the electricity generated in the UK in the third quarter of 2019, producing 28.8 TWh of electricity. The UK is one of the best sites in Europe for wind energy, and wind power production is the country's fastest-growing supply; in 2019, almost 20 per cent of the UK's total electricity was generated by wind power.

In 2023, the UK had 9 nuclear reactors normally generating about 15 per cent of the UK's electricity. Unlike Germany and Japan, there are currently two reactors under construction and more planned. In the late 1990s, nuclear power plants contributed around 25 per cent of the total annual electricity generation in the UK, but this has gradually declined as old plants have been shut down. The UK government is investing in Small Modular Reactors and Advanced Modular Reactors research and development.

In 2021, the UK produced 935 thousand barrels per day (bbl/d) of oil (and other liquids) and consumed 1,258 thousand bbl/d. Production is now in decline and the UK has been a net importer of oil since 2005. , the UK had around 2 billion barrels of proven crude oil reserves.

In 2021, the UK was the 21st-largest producer of natural gas in the world. Production is now in decline and the UK has been a net importer of natural gas since 2004.

In 2020, the UK produced 1.8 million tonnes of coal falling 91% in 10 years. In 2020 it had proven recoverable coal reserves of 26 million tonnes. The UK Coal Authority has stated that there is a potential to produce between 7 billion tonnes and 16 billion tonnes of coal through underground coal gasification (UCG) or 'fracking', and based on current UK coal consumption, such reserves could last between 200 and 400 years. Environmental and social concerns have been raised over chemicals contaminating groundwater and minor earthquakes damaging homes.

Water supply and sanitation

Access to improved water supply and sanitation in the UK is universal. It is estimated that 96.7 per cent of households are connected to the sewer network. According to the Environment Agency, total water abstraction for public water supply in the UK was 16,406 megalitres per day in 2007.

In England and Wales water and sewerage services are provided by 10 private regional water and sewerage companies and 13 mostly smaller private "water only" companies. In Scotland, water and sewerage services are provided by a single public company, Scottish Water. In Northern Ireland water and sewerage services are also provided by a single public entity, Northern Ireland Water.

Demographics

A census is taken simultaneously in all parts of the UK every 10 years. In the 2011 census the total population of the United Kingdom was 63,181,775. It is the fourth-largest in Europe (after Russia, Germany and France), the fifth-largest in the Commonwealth and the 22nd-largest in the world. In mid-2014 and mid-2015 net long-term international migration contributed more to population growth. In mid-2012 and mid-2013 natural change contributed the most to population growth. Between 2001 and 2011 the population increased by an average annual rate of approximately 0.7 per cent. This compares to 0.3 per cent per year in the period 1991 to 2001 and 0.2 per cent in the decade 1981 to 1991. The 2011 census also showed that, over the previous 100 years, the proportion of the population aged 0–14 fell from 31 per cent to 18 per cent, and the proportion of people aged 65 and over rose from 5 to 16 per cent. In 2018 the median age of the UK population was 41.7 years.

England's population in 2011 was 53 million, representing some 84 per cent of the UK total. It is one of the most densely populated countries in the world, with 420 people resident per square kilometre in mid-2015, with a particular concentration in London and the south-east. The 2011 census put Scotland's population at 5.3 million, Wales at 3.06 million and Northern Ireland at 1.81 million.

In 2017 the average total fertility rate (TFR) across the UK was 1.74 children born per woman. While a rising birth rate is contributing to population growth, it remains considerably below the baby boom peak of 2.95 children per woman in 1964, or the high of 6.02 children born per woman in 1815, below the replacement rate of 2.1, but higher than the 2001 record low of 1.63. In 2011, 47.3 per cent of births in the UK were to unmarried women. The Office for National Statistics published a bulletin in 2015 showing that, out of the UK population aged 16 and over, 1.7 per cent identify as gay, lesbian, or bisexual (2.0 per cent of males and 1.5 per cent of females); 4.5 per cent of respondents responded with "other", "I don't know", or did not respond. The number of transgender people in the UK was estimated to be between 65,000 and 300,000 by research between 2001 and 2008.

Ethnic groups

Historically, indigenous British people were thought to be descended from the various ethnic groups that settled there before the 12th century: the Celts, Romans, Anglo-Saxons, Norse and the Normans. Welsh people could be the oldest ethnic group in the UK. A 2006 genetic study shows that more than 50 per cent of England's gene pool contains Germanic Y chromosomes. Another 2005 genetic analysis indicates that "about 75 per cent of the traceable ancestors of the modern British population had arrived in the British isles by about 6,200 years ago, at the start of the British Neolithic or Stone Age", and that the British broadly share a common ancestry with the Basque people. The UK has a history of non-white immigration with Liverpool having the oldest Black population in the country dating back to at least the 1730s during the period of the African slave trade. During this period it is estimated the Afro-Caribbean population of Great Britain was 10,000 to 15,000 which later declined due to the abolition of slavery. The UK also has the oldest Chinese community in Europe, dating to the arrival of Chinese seamen in the 19th century. In 1950 there were probably fewer than 20,000 non-white residents in Britain, almost all born overseas. In 1951 there were an estimated 94,500 people living in Britain who had been born in South Asia, China, Africa and the Caribbean, just under 0.2 per cent of the UK population. By 1961 this number had more than quadrupled to 384,000, just over 0.7 per cent of the United Kingdom population.

Since 1948 substantial immigration from Africa, the Caribbean and South Asia has been a legacy of ties forged by the British Empire. Migration from new EU member states in Central and Eastern Europe since 2004 has resulted in growth in these population groups, although some of this migration has been temporary. Since the 1990s, there has been substantial diversification of the immigrant population, with migrants to the UK coming from a much wider range of countries than previous waves, which tended to involve larger numbers of migrants coming from a relatively small number of countries.
Academics have argued that the ethnicity categories employed in British national statistics, which were first introduced in the 1991 census, involve confusion between the concepts of ethnicity and race. , 87.2 per cent of the UK population identified themselves as white, meaning 12.8 per cent of the UK population identify themselves as of one of number of ethnic minority groups. In the 2001 census, this figure was 7.9 per cent of the UK population. Because of differences in the wording of the census forms used in England and Wales, Scotland and Northern Ireland, data on the Other White group is not available for the UK as a whole, but in England and Wales this was the fastest-growing group between the 2001 and 2011 censuses, increasing by 1.1 million (1.8 percentage points). Amongst groups for which comparable data is available for all parts of the UK level, the Other Asian category increased from 0.4 per cent to 1.4 per cent of the population between 2001 and 2011, while the Mixed category rose from 1.2 per cent to 2 per cent.

Ethnic diversity varies significantly across the UK. 30.4 per cent of London's population and 37.4 per cent of Leicester's was estimated to be non-white , whereas less than 5 per cent of the populations of North East England, Wales and the South West were from ethnic minorities, according to the 2001 census. , 31.4 per cent of primary and 27.9 per cent of secondary pupils at state schools in England were members of an ethnic minority. The 1991 census was the first UK census to have a question on ethnic group. In the 1991 UK census 94.1 per cent of people reported themselves as being White British, White Irish or White Other with 5.9 per cent of people reporting themselves as coming from other minority groups.

Languages

The English language is the official and most spoken language of the United Kingdom that originated from England. The United Kingdom proactively promotes the language globally to build connections, understanding and trust between people in the UK and countries worldwide. It is estimated that 95 per cent of the UK's population are monolingual English speakers. 5.5 per cent of the population are estimated to speak languages brought to the UK as a result of relatively recent immigration. South Asian languages are the largest grouping which includes Punjabi, Urdu, Bengali, Sylheti, Hindi and Gujarati. According to the 2011 census, Polish has become the second-largest language spoken in England and has 546,000 speakers. In 2019, some three quarters of a million people spoke little or no English.

Three indigenous Celtic languages are spoken in the UK: Welsh, Irish and Scottish Gaelic. Cornish, which became extinct as a first language in the late 18th century, is subject to revival efforts and has a small group of second language speakers. According to the 2021 census, the Welsh-speaking population of Wales aged three or older was 538,300 people (17.8 per cent). In addition, it is estimated that about 200,000 Welsh speakers live in England. In the 2011 census in Northern Ireland 167,487 people (10.4 per cent) stated that they had "some knowledge of Irish" (see Irish language in Northern Ireland), almost exclusively in the nationalist (mainly Catholic) population. Over 92,000 people in Scotland (just under 2 per cent of the population) had some Gaelic language ability, including 72 per cent of those living in the Outer Hebrides. The number of children being taught either Welsh or Scottish Gaelic is increasing. Among emigrant-descended populations some Scottish Gaelic is still spoken in Canada (principally Nova Scotia and Cape Breton Island), and Welsh in Patagonia, Argentina.

Scots, a language descended from early northern Middle English, has limited recognition alongside its regional variant, Ulster Scots in Northern Ireland, without specific commitments to protection and promotion.

As of April 2020, there are said to be around 151,000 users of British Sign Language (BSL), a sign language used by deaf people, in the UK. BSL was recognised as a language of England, Scotland and Wales in law in 2022. It is compulsory for pupils to study a second language from the age of seven in England. French and Spanish are the two most commonly taught second languages in the United Kingdom. All pupils in Wales are either taught Welsh as a second language up to age 16, or are taught in Welsh as a first language. Welsh was recognised as having official status in Wales in 2011. Irish was recognised as having official status in Northern Ireland in 2022.

Religion

Forms of Christianity have dominated religious life in what is now the United Kingdom for more than 1,400 years. Although a majority of citizens still identify with Christianity in many surveys, regular church attendance has fallen dramatically since the middle of the 20th century, while immigration and demographic change have contributed to the growth of other faiths, most notably Islam. This has led some commentators to variously describe the UK as a multi-faith, secularised, or post-Christian society.

In the 2001 census, 71.6 per cent of all respondents indicated that they were Christians, with the next largest faiths being Islam (2.8 per cent), Hinduism (1.0 per cent), Sikhism (0.6 per cent), Judaism (0.5 per cent), Buddhism (0.3 per cent) and all other religions (0.3 per cent). Of the respondents, 15 per cent stated that they had no religion and a further 7 per cent did not state a religious preference. A Tearfund survey in 2007 showed that only one in ten Britons actually attend church weekly. Between the 2001 and 2011 census, there was a 12 per cent decrease in the number of people who identified as Christian, whilst the percentage of those reporting no religious affiliation doubled. This contrasted with growth in the other main religious group categories, with the number of Muslims increasing by the most substantial margin to a total of about 5 per cent. The Muslim population has increased from 1.6 million in 2001 to 2.7 million in 2011, making it the second-largest religious group in the UK.

In a 2016 survey conducted by BSA (British Social Attitudes) on religious affiliation, 53 per cent of respondents indicated 'no religion', 41 per cent indicated they were Christians, followed by 6 per cent who affiliated with other religions (e.g. Islam, Hinduism, Judaism, etc.). Among Christians, adherents to the Church of England constituted 15 per cent, to the Catholic Church 9 per cent, and other Christians (including Presbyterians, Methodists, other Protestants, as well as Eastern Orthodox) constituted 17 per cent. Of the young people aged 18 to 24 that responded, 71 per cent said they had no religion.

The Church of England is the established church in England. It retains a representation in the UK Parliament, and the British monarch is its Supreme Governor. In Scotland, the Church of Scotland is recognised as the national church. It is not subject to state control, and the British monarch is an ordinary member, required to swear an oath to "maintain and preserve the Protestant Religion and Presbyterian Church Government" upon his or her accession. The Church in Wales was disestablished in 1920 and, because the Church of Ireland was disestablished in 1870 before the partition of Ireland, there is no established church in Northern Ireland. Although there are no UK-wide data in the 2001 census on adherence to individual Christian denominations, it has been estimated that 62 per cent of Christians are Anglican, 13.5 per cent Catholic, 6 per cent Presbyterian, and 3.4 per cent Methodist, with small numbers of other Protestant denominations such as Plymouth Brethren, and Orthodox churches.

In the 2021 UK census, less than half the English and Welsh population were Christian; 46.2% of the people of England and Wales said they were Christian, 37.2% that they had no religion, and 6.5% said they were Muslim.

Migration

The United Kingdom has experienced successive waves of migration. The Great Famine in Ireland, then part of the United Kingdom, resulted in perhaps a million people migrating to Great Britain. Throughout the 19th century, a small population of 28,644 German immigrants built up in England and Wales. London held around half of this population, and other small communities existed in Manchester, Bradford and elsewhere. The German immigrant community was the largest group until 1891, when it became second to Russian Jews. After 1881, Russian Jews suffered bitter persecutions and 2 million left the Russian Empire by 1914. Around 120,000 settled permanently in Britain, becoming the largest ethnic minority from outside the British Isles, and by 1938 this population had increased to 370,000. Unable to return to Poland at the end of the Second World War, over 120,000 Polish veterans remained in the UK permanently. After the war, many people immigrated from colonies and former colonies in the Caribbean and Indian subcontinent, as a legacy of empire or driven by labour shortages. In 1841, only 0.25 per cent of the population of England and Wales was born in a foreign country, increasing to 1.5 per cent by 1901, 2.6 per cent by 1931 and 4.4 per cent in 1951.

In 2014, the immigration net increase was 318,000: immigration was at 641,000, up from 526,000 in 2013, while the number of emigrants leaving for over a year was 323,000. A recent migration trend has been the arrival of workers from the new EU member states in Eastern Europe, known as the A8 countries. In 2011, citizens of new EU member states made up 13 per cent of immigrants. The UK applied temporary restrictions to citizens of Romania and Bulgaria, both of which joined the EU in January 2007. Research conducted by the Migration Policy Institute for the Equality and Human Rights Commission suggests that, between May 2004 and September 2009, 1.5 million workers migrated from the new EU member states to the UK, most of them Polish. Many subsequently returned home, resulting in a net increase in the number of nationals of the new member states in the UK. The late-2000s recession in the UK reduced the economic incentive for Poles to migrate to the UK, making migration temporary and circular. The proportion of foreign-born people in the UK remains slightly below that of many other European countries.

Immigration is now contributing to a rising UK population, with arrivals and UK-born children of migrants accounting for about half of the population increase between 1991 and 2001. According to official statistics released in 2015, 27 per cent of UK live births in 2014 were to mothers born outside the UK. The ONS reported that net migration rose from 2009 to 2010 by 21 per cent to 239,000.

In 2013, approximately 208,000 foreign nationals were naturalised as British citizens, the highest number since 1962. This figure fell to around 125,800 in 2014. Between 2009 and 2013, the average number of British citizenships granted annually was 195,800. The most common previous nationalities of those naturalised in 2014 were Indian, Pakistani, Filipino, Nigerian, Bangladeshi, Nepali, Chinese, South African, Polish and Somali. The total number of grants of settlement, which confer permanent residence in the UK but not citizenship, was approximately 154,700 in 2013, higher than the previous two years.

In 2008, the British Government introduced a points-based immigration system for immigration from outside the European Economic Area to replace former schemes, including the Scottish Government's Fresh Talent Initiative. In June 2010, a temporary limit on immigration from outside the EU was introduced, aiming to discourage applications before a permanent cap was imposed in April 2011.

Emigration was an important feature of British society in the 19th century. Between 1815 and 1930, around 11.4 million people emigrated from Britain and 7.3 million from Ireland. Estimates show that by the end of the 20th century, some 300 million people of British and Irish descent were permanently settled around the globe. Today, at least 5.5 million UK-born people live abroad, mainly in Australia, Spain, the United States and Canada.

Education

Education in the United Kingdom is a devolved matter, with each country having a separate education system.

Considering the four systems together, about 38 per cent of the United Kingdom population has a university or college degree, which is the highest percentage in Europe, and among the highest percentages in the world. The United Kingdom has some of the best universities in the world with Oxford University and Cambridge University often competing for the number 1 position on global rankings.

A government commission's report in 2014 found that privately educated people comprise 7 per cent of the general population of the UK but much larger percentages of the top professions, the most extreme case quoted being 71 per cent of senior judges.

England

Whilst education in England is the responsibility of the Secretary of State for Education, the day-to-day administration and funding of state schools is the responsibility of local authorities. Universally free of charge state education was introduced piecemeal between 1870 and 1944. Education is now mandatory from ages 5 to 16, and in England youngsters must stay in education or training until they are 18. In 2011, the Trends in International Mathematics and Science Study (TIMSS) rated 13–14-year-old pupils in England and Wales tenth in the world for maths and ninth for science. The majority of children are educated in state-sector schools, a small proportion of which select on the grounds of academic ability. Two of the top 10 performing schools in terms of GCSE results in 2006 were state-run grammar schools. In 2010, over half of places at the University of Oxford and the University of Cambridge were taken by students from state schools, while the proportion of children in England attending private schools is around 7 per cent.

Scotland

Education in Scotland is the responsibility of the Cabinet Secretary for Education and Lifelong Learning, with day-to-day administration and funding of state schools the responsibility of Local Authorities. Two non-departmental public bodies have key roles in Scottish education. The Scottish Qualifications Authority is responsible for the development, accreditation, assessment and certification of qualifications other than degrees which are delivered at secondary schools, post-secondary colleges of further education and other centres. Learning and Teaching Scotland provides advice, resources and staff development to education professionals. Scotland first legislated for compulsory education in 1496. The proportion of children in Scotland attending private schools is just over 4 per cent in 2016, but it has been falling slowly in recent years. Scottish students who attend Scottish universities pay neither tuition fees nor graduate endowment charges, as fees were abolished in 2001 and the graduate endowment scheme was abolished in 2008.

Wales 

The Welsh Government's Minister for Education has responsibility for education in Wales. State funded education is available to children from the age of three whilst the legal obligation for parents to have their children educated, usually at school, begins at age five. A sizeable minority of pupils are educated in Welsh whilst the rest are obliged to study the language until the age of 16. Wales' performance in Pisa testing, which compares the academic performance of adolescents around the world, has improved in recent years but remains lower than other parts of the UK. In 2019, just under 60% of entrants passed their main English and Maths GCSEs. The obligation to receive education in Wales ends at the age of 16. In 2017 and 2018, just under 80% of 16 to 18 and just under 40% of 19 to 24-year-olds were in some kind of education or training.

Northern Ireland 

Education in Northern Ireland is the responsibility of the Minister of Education, although responsibility at a local level is administered by the Education Authority which is further sub-divided into five geographical areas. The Council for the Curriculum, Examinations & Assessment (CCEA) is the body responsible for advising the government on what should be taught in Northern Ireland's schools, monitoring standards and awarding qualifications.

Healthcare

Healthcare in the United Kingdom is a devolved matter and each country has its own system of private and publicly funded healthcare. Public healthcare is provided to all UK permanent residents and is mostly free at the point of need, being paid for from general taxation. The World Health Organization, in 2000, ranked the provision of healthcare in the United Kingdom as fifteenth best in Europe and eighteenth in the world.

Since 1979 expenditure on healthcare has been increased significantly. The 2018 OECD data, which incorporates in health a chunk of what in the UK is classified as social care, has the UK spending £3,121 per head. In 2017 the UK spent £2,989 per person on healthcare, around the median for members of the Organisation for Economic Co-operation and Development.

Regulatory bodies are organised on a UK-wide basis such as the General Medical Council, the Nursing and Midwifery Council and non-governmental-based, such as the Royal Colleges. Political and operational responsibility for healthcare lies with four national executives; healthcare in England is the responsibility of the UK Government; healthcare in Northern Ireland is the responsibility of the Northern Ireland Executive; healthcare in Scotland is the responsibility of the Scottish Government; and healthcare in Wales is the responsibility of the Welsh Government. Each National Health Service has different policies and priorities, resulting in contrasts.

Culture

The culture of the United Kingdom has been influenced by many factors including: the nation's island status; its history as a western liberal democracy and a major power; as well as being a political union of four countries with each preserving elements of distinctive traditions, customs and symbolism. As a result of the British Empire, British influence can be observed in the language, culture and legal systems of many of its former colonies, in particular, the United States, Australia, Canada, New Zealand, and Ireland, a common culture that is known today as the Anglosphere. The historian Paul Johnson has called the United Kingdom–United States relations the "cornerstone of the modern, democratic world order". The substantial cultural influence of the United Kingdom has led to it being described as a "cultural superpower". A global opinion poll for the BBC saw the United Kingdom ranked the third most positively viewed nation in the world (behind Germany and Canada) in 2013 and 2014.

Literature

"British literature" refers to literature associated with the United Kingdom, the Isle of Man and the Channel Islands. Most British literature is in the English language. In 2005, some 206,000 books were published in the United Kingdom and in 2006 it was the largest publisher of books in the world.

The English playwright and poet William Shakespeare is widely regarded as the greatest dramatist of all time. The 20th-century English crime writer Agatha Christie is the best-selling novelist of all time. Twelve of the top 25 of 100 novels by British writers chosen by a BBC poll of global critics were written by women; these included works by George Eliot, Virginia Woolf, Charlotte and Emily Brontë, Mary Shelley, Jane Austen, Doris Lessing and Zadie Smith.

Scotland's contributions include Arthur Conan Doyle (the creator of Sherlock Holmes), Sir Walter Scott, J. M. Barrie, Robert Louis Stevenson and the poet Robert Burns. More recently Hugh MacDiarmid and Neil M. Gunn contributed to the Scottish Renaissance, with grimmer works from Ian Rankin and Iain Banks. Scotland's capital, Edinburgh, was UNESCO's first worldwide City of Literature.

Welsh literature includes Britain's oldest known poem, Y Gododdin, which was composed most likely in the late 6th century. It was written in Cumbric or Old Welsh and contains the earliest known reference to King Arthur. The Arthurian legend was further developed by Geoffrey of Monmouth. Poet Dafydd ap Gwilym (fl. 1320–1370) is regarded as one of the greatest European poets of his age. Daniel Owen is credited as the first Welsh-language novelist, publishing Rhys Lewis in 1885. The best-known of the Anglo-Welsh poets are Dylan Thomas and R. S. Thomas, the latter nominated for the Nobel Prize in Literature in 1996. Leading Welsh novelists of the twentieth century include Richard Llewellyn and Kate Roberts.

Irish writers, living at a time when all of Ireland was part of the United Kingdom, include Oscar Wilde, Bram Stoker and George Bernard Shaw. There have been many authors whose origins were from outside the United Kingdom but who moved to the UK. These include Joseph Conrad, T. S. Eliot, Kazuo Ishiguro, Sir Salman Rushdie and Ezra Pound.

Philosophy

The United Kingdom is famous for the tradition of 'British Empiricism', a branch of the philosophy of knowledge that states that only knowledge verified by experience is valid, and 'Scottish Philosophy', sometimes referred to as the 'Scottish School of Common Sense'. The most famous philosophers of British Empiricism are John Locke, George Berkeley and David Hume; while Dugald Stewart, Thomas Reid and William Hamilton were major exponents of the Scottish "common sense" school. Two Britons are also notable for the ethical theory of utilitarianism, a moral philosophy first used by Jeremy Bentham and later by John Stuart Mill in his short work Utilitarianism.

Music

Various styles of music have become popular in the UK, including the indigenous folk music of England, Wales, Scotland and Northern Ireland. Historically, there has been exceptional Renaissance music from the Tudor period, with masses, madrigals and lute music by Thomas Tallis, John Taverner, William Byrd, Orlando Gibbons and John Dowland. After the Stuart Restoration, an English tradition of dramatic masques, anthems and airs became established, led by Henry Purcell, followed by Thomas Arne and others. The German-born composer George Frideric Handel became a naturalised British citizen in 1727, when he composed the anthem Zadok the Priest for the coronation of George II; it became the traditional ceremonial music for anointing all future monarchs. Handel's many oratorios, such as his famous Messiah, were written in the English language. Ceremonial music is also performed to mark Remembrance Sunday across the UK, including the Traditional Music played at the Cenotaph. In the second half of the 19th century, as Arthur Sullivan and his librettist W. S. Gilbert wrote their popular Savoy operas, Edward Elgar's wide range of music rivalled that of his contemporaries on the continent. Increasingly, however, composers became inspired by the English countryside and its folk music, notably Gustav Holst, Ralph Vaughan Williams, and Benjamin Britten, a pioneer of modern British opera. Among the many post-war composers, some of the most notable have made their own personal choice of musical identity: Peter Maxwell Davies (Orkney), Harrison Birtwistle (mythological), and John Tavener (religious).

According to the website of The New Grove Dictionary of Music and Musicians, the term "pop music" originated in Britain in the mid-1950s to describe rock and roll's fusion with the "new youth music". The Oxford Dictionary of Music states that artists such as The Beatles and The Rolling Stones drove pop music to the forefront of popular music in the early 1960s. In the following years, Britain widely occupied a part in the development of rock music, with British acts pioneering hard rock; raga rock; heavy metal; space rock; glam rock; Gothic rock, and ska punk. In addition, British acts developed psychedelic rock; and punk rock. Besides rock music, British acts also developed neo soul and created dubstep. Pop remains the most popular music genre by sales and streams of singles, with 33.4 per cent of that market in 2016, followed by hip-hop and R&B at 24.5 per cent. Rock is not far behind, at 22.6 per cent. The modern UK is known to produce some of the most prominent English-speaking rappers along with the United States, including Stormzy, Kano, Yxng Bane, Ramz, Little Simz and Skepta.

The Beatles have international sales of over 1 billion units and are the biggest-selling and most influential band in the history of popular music. Other prominent British contributors to have influenced popular music over the last 50 years include The Rolling Stones, Pink Floyd, Queen, Led Zeppelin, the Bee Gees, and Elton John, all of whom have worldwide record sales of 200 million or more. The Brit Awards are the BPI's annual music awards, and some of the British recipients of the Outstanding Contribution to Music award include; The Who, David Bowie, Eric Clapton, Rod Stewart, The Police, and Fleetwood Mac (who are a British-American band). More recent UK music acts that have had international success include George Michael, Oasis, Spice Girls, Radiohead, Coldplay, Arctic Monkeys, Robbie Williams, Amy Winehouse, Adele, Ed Sheeran, One Direction and Harry Styles.

A number of UK cities are known for their music. Acts from Liverpool have had 54 UK chart number 1 hit singles, more per capita than any other city worldwide. Glasgow's contribution to music was recognised in 2008 when it was named a UNESCO City of Music. Manchester played a role in the spread of dance music such as acid house, and from the mid-1990s, Britpop. London and Bristol are closely associated with the origins of electronic music sub-genres such as drum and bass and trip hop. Birmingham became known as the birthplace of heavy metal, with the band Black Sabbath starting there in the 1960s.

Visual art

The history of British visual art forms part of western art history. Major British artists include: the Romantics William Blake, John Constable, Samuel Palmer and J.M.W. Turner; the portrait painters Sir Joshua Reynolds and Lucian Freud; the landscape artists Thomas Gainsborough and L. S. Lowry; the pioneer of the Arts and Crafts Movement William Morris; the figurative painter Francis Bacon; the Pop artists Peter Blake, Richard Hamilton and David Hockney; the pioneers of Conceptual art movement Art & Language; the collaborative duo Gilbert and George; the abstract artist Howard Hodgkin; and the sculptors Antony Gormley, Anish Kapoor and Henry Moore. During the late 1980s and 1990s the Saatchi Gallery in London helped to bring to public attention a group of multi-genre artists who would become known as the "Young British Artists": Damien Hirst, Chris Ofili, Rachel Whiteread, Tracey Emin, Mark Wallinger, Steve McQueen, Sam Taylor-Wood and the Chapman Brothers are among the better-known members of this loosely affiliated movement.

The Royal Academy in London is a key organisation for the promotion of the visual arts in the United Kingdom. Major schools of art in the UK include: the six-school University of the Arts London, which includes the Central Saint Martins College of Art and Design and Chelsea College of Art and Design; Goldsmiths, University of London; the Slade School of Fine Art (part of University College London); the Glasgow School of Art; the Royal College of Art; and The Ruskin School of Drawing and Fine Art (part of the University of Oxford). The Courtauld Institute of Art is a leading centre for the teaching of the history of art. Important art galleries in the United Kingdom include the National Gallery, National Portrait Gallery, Tate Britain and Tate Modern (the most-visited modern art gallery in the world, with around 4.7 million visitors per year).

Cinema

The United Kingdom has had a considerable influence on the history of the cinema. The British directors Alfred Hitchcock, whose film Vertigo is considered by some critics as the best film of all time, and David Lean are among the most critically acclaimed of all time. Many British actors have achieved international fame and critical success. Some of the most commercially successful films of all time have been produced in the United Kingdom, including two of the highest-grossing film franchises (Harry Potter and James Bond). Ealing Studios has a claim to being the oldest continuously working film studio in the world.

In 2009, British films grossed around $2 billion worldwide and achieved a market share of around 7 per cent globally and 17 per cent in the United Kingdom. UK box-office takings totalled £944 million in 2009, with around 173 million admissions. The annual British Academy Film Awards are hosted by the British Academy of Film and Television Arts.

Cuisine 

British cuisine developed from various influences reflective of its land, settlements, arrivals of new settlers and immigrants, trade and colonialism. Celtic agriculture and animal breeding produced a wide variety of foodstuffs for indigenous Celts and Britons. Anglo-Saxon England developed meat and savoury herb stewing techniques before the practice became common in Europe. The Norman conquest introduced exotic spices into England in the Middle Ages. The British Empire facilitated a knowledge of Indian cuisine with its "strong, penetrating spices and herbs". British cuisine has absorbed the cultural influence of those who have settled in Britain, producing hybrid dishes, such as chicken tikka masala. Vegan and vegetarian diets have increased in Britain in recent years. In 2021, a survey found that 8% of British respondents eat a plant-based diet and 36% of respondents have a favourable view of plant-based diets.

Media

The BBC, founded in 1922, is the UK's publicly funded radio, television and Internet broadcasting corporation, and is the oldest and largest broadcaster in the world. It operates numerous television and radio stations in the UK and abroad and its domestic services are funded by the television licence. The BBC World Service is an international broadcaster owned and operated by the BBC. It is the world's largest of any kind. It broadcasts radio news, speech and discussions in more than 40 languages.

Other major players in the UK media include ITV plc, which operates 11 of the 15 regional television broadcasters that make up the ITV Network, and Sky. Newspapers produced in the United Kingdom include The Times, The Guardian, The Observer, The Economist, and the Financial Times. Magazines and journals published in the United Kingdom that have achieved worldwide circulation include Nature, New Scientist, The Spectator, Prospect, NME, Radio Times, and The Economist.

London dominates the media sector in the UK: national newspapers and television and radio are largely based there, although Manchester is also a significant national media centre. Edinburgh and Glasgow, and Cardiff, are important centres of newspaper and broadcasting production in Scotland and Wales, respectively. The UK publishing sector, including books, directories and databases, journals, magazines and business media, newspapers and news agencies, has a combined turnover of around £20 billion and employs around 167,000 people. In 2015, the UK published 2,710 book titles per million inhabitants, more than any other country, much of this being exported to other Anglophone countries.

In 2009, it was estimated that individuals viewed a mean of 3.75 hours of television per day and 2.81 hours of radio. In that year the main BBC public service broadcasting channels accounted for an estimated 28.4 per cent of all television viewing; the three main independent channels accounted for 29.5 per cent and the increasingly important other satellite and digital channels for the remaining 42.1 per cent. Sales of newspapers have fallen since the 1970s and in 2010 41 per cent of people reported reading a daily national newspaper. In 2010, 82.5 per cent of the UK population were Internet users, the highest proportion amongst the 20 countries with the largest total number of users in that year.

Symbols

The flag of the United Kingdom is the Union Flag (also referred to as the Union Jack). It was created in 1606 by the superimposition of the Flag of England, representing Saint George, on the Flag of Scotland, representing Saint Andrew, and was updated in 1801 with the addition of Saint Patrick's Flag. Wales is not represented in the Union Flag, as Wales had been conquered and annexed to England prior to the formation of the United Kingdom. The possibility of redesigning the Union Flag to include representation of Wales has not been completely ruled out. The national anthem of the United Kingdom is "God Save the King", with "King" replaced with "Queen" in the lyrics whenever the monarch is a woman.

Britannia is a national personification of the United Kingdom, originating from Roman Britain. Britannia is symbolised as a young woman with brown or golden hair, wearing a Corinthian helmet and white robes. She holds Poseidon's three-pronged trident and a shield, bearing the Union Flag.

Beside the lion and the unicorn and the dragon of heraldry, the bulldog is an iconic animal and commonly represented with the Union Jack. It has been associated with Winston Churchill's defiance of Nazi Germany. A now rare personification is a character originating in the 18th century, John Bull, a portly country gentleman dressed in a top hat and tailcoat with a Union Jack waistcoat, often accompanied by a bulldog.

The floral emblems of the three kingdoms are the Tudor rose for England, the thistle for Scotland and the shamrock for Northern Ireland; they are sometimes shown intertwined to represent unity. The daffodil and the leek are the symbols of Wales. Alternatives include the Royal Oak for England and the flax flower for Northern Ireland.

Sport

Association football, tennis, table tennis, badminton, rugby union, rugby league, rugby sevens, golf, boxing, netball, water polo, field hockey, billiards, darts, rowing, rounders and cricket originated or were substantially developed in the UK, with the rules and codes of many modern sports invented and codified in late 19th-century Victorian Britain. In 2012, the President of the IOC, Jacques Rogge, stated, "This great, sports-loving country is widely recognised as the birthplace of modern sport. It was here that the concepts of sportsmanship and fair play were first codified into clear rules and regulations. It was here that sport was included as an educational tool in the school curriculum".

A 2003 poll found that football is the most popular sport in the UK. England is recognised by FIFA as the birthplace of club football, and the Football Association is the oldest of its kind, with the rules of football first drafted in 1863 by Ebenezer Cobb Morley. Each of the Home Nations (England, Scotland, Wales and Northern Ireland) has its own football association, national team and league system, and each is individually a governing member of the International Football Association Board alongside FIFA. The English top division, the Premier League, is the most watched football league in the world. The first international football match was contested by England and Scotland on 30 November 1872. England, Scotland, Wales and Northern Ireland usually compete as separate countries in international competitions.

In 2003, rugby union was ranked the second most popular sport in the UK. The sport was created in Rugby School, Warwickshire, and the first rugby international took place on 27 March 1871 between England and Scotland. England, Scotland, Wales, Ireland, France and Italy compete in the Six Nations Championship, which is the premier international rugby union tournament in the northern hemisphere. Sports governing bodies in England, Scotland, Wales and Ireland organise and regulate the game separately. Every four years, the Home Nations make a combined team known as the British and Irish Lions which tours Australia, New Zealand and South Africa.

Cricket was invented in England, and its laws were established by the Marylebone Cricket Club in 1788. The England cricket team, controlled by the England and Wales Cricket Board, and the Ireland cricket team, controlled by Cricket Ireland are the only national teams in the UK with Test status. Team members are drawn from the main county sides, and include both English and Welsh players. Cricket is distinct from football and rugby where Wales and England field separate national teams, although Wales has fielded its own national cricket team in the past. Scottish players have played for England because the Scotland cricket team does not have Test status and has only recently started to play in One Day Internationals. Scotland, England (and Wales), and Ireland (including Northern Ireland) have competed at the Cricket World Cup, which England won in 2019. There is a professional league championship that consists of clubs representing 17 English counties and one Welsh county.

The modern game of tennis originated in Birmingham, England, in the 1860s before spreading around the world. The world's oldest tennis tournament, the Wimbledon championships, was first held in 1877 and today takes place over two weeks in late June and early July.

The UK is closely associated with motorsport. Many teams and drivers in Formula One (F1) are based in the UK, and the country has won more drivers' and constructors' titles in the F1 World Championship than any other. The UK hosted the first F1 Grand Prix in 1950 at Silverstone, where the British Grand Prix is held each year in July.

Golf is the sixth most popular sport, by participation, in the UK. Although The Royal and Ancient Golf Club of St Andrews in Scotland is the sport's home course, the world's oldest golf course is in fact Musselburgh Links' Old Golf Course. In 1764, the standard 18-hole golf course was created at St Andrews when members modified the course from 22 to 18 holes. The British Open—the oldest golf tournament in the world and the first major championship in golf—is played annually on the weekend of the third Friday in July.

Rugby league originated in Huddersfield, West Yorkshire, in 1895 and is generally played in Northern England. A single 'Great Britain Lions' team competed in the Rugby League World Cup and Test match games before 2008 when England, Scotland and Ireland began to compete as separate league nations. Great Britain is still retained as the full national team. Super League is the highest level of professional rugby league in the UK and Europe. It consists of 11 teams from Northern England, and one each from London, Wales and France.

The 'Queensberry rules', the code of general rules in boxing, was named after John Douglas, 9th Marquess of Queensberry in 1867, and formed the basis of modern boxing. Snooker is another of the UK's popular sporting exports, with the world championship held annually in Sheffield. Gaelic football and hurling are popular team sports in Northern Ireland, both in terms of participation and spectatorship, and both sports are played by Irish expatriates in the UK and the United States. Shinty (or camanachd) is popular in the Scottish Highlands. Highland games are held in spring and summer in Scotland, celebrating Scottish and Celtic culture and heritage, especially that of the Scottish Highlands.

The United Kingdom hosted the Summer Olympic Games in 1908, 1948 and 2012, with London acting as the host city on all three occasions. Birmingham hosted the 2022 Commonwealth Games, the seventh time the UK has hosted the Commonwealth Games.

See also

 Outline of the United Kingdom
 Outline of England
 Outline of Northern Ireland
 Outline of Scotland
 Outline of Wales
 Index of United Kingdom-related articles
 International rankings of the United Kingdom
 Historiography of the United Kingdom
 Historiography of the British Empire
 United Kingdom–Crown Dependencies Customs Union

Notes

References

External links

Government
 Official website of HM Government
 Official website of the British Monarchy
 The official site of the British Prime Minister's Office

General information
 United Kingdom from the BBC News
 United Kingdom. The World Factbook. Central Intelligence Agency.
 United Kingdom from UCB Libraries GovPubs
 
 United Kingdom Encyclopædia Britannica entry
 
 
 Key Development Forecasts for the United Kingdom from International Futures

Travel
 Official tourist guide to Britain

 
British Islands
Countries in Europe
English-speaking countries and territories
G20 nations
Island countries
Northwestern European countries
Member states of NATO
Member states of the Commonwealth of Nations
Member states of the Council of Europe
Member states of the United Nations
OECD members